4F2 cell-surface antigen heavy chain  is a protein that in humans is encoded by the SLC3A2 (solute carrier family 3 member 2) gene.

SLC3A2 comprises the heavy subunit of the large neutral amino acid transporter (LAT1) that is also known as CD98 (cluster of differentiation 98).

Function 

SLC3A2 is a member of the solute carrier family and encodes a cell surface, transmembrane protein with an alpha-amylase domain. The protein exists as the heavy chain of a heterodimer, covalently bound through di-sulfide bonds to one of several possible light chains. It associates with integrins and mediates integrin-dependent signaling related to normal cell growth and tumorigenesis. Alternate transcriptional splice variants, encoding different isoforms, have been characterized.

LAT1 is a heterodimeric membrane transport protein that preferentially transports neutral branched (valine, leucine, isoleucine) and aromatic (tryptophan, tyrosine, phenylalanine) amino acids. LAT is highly expressed in brain capillaries (which form the blood brain barrier) relative to other tissues.

A functional LAT1 transporter is composed of two proteins encoded by two distinct genes:
 4F2hc/CD98 heavy subunit protein encoded by the SLC3A2 gene (this gene)
 CD98 light subunit protein encoded by the SLC7A5 gene

Interactions 

SLC3A2 has been shown to interact with SLC7A7.

Additionally, SLC3A2 is a constituent member of the system xc- cystine/glutamate antiporter, complexing with SLC7A11.

See also 
 Heterodimeric amino acid transporter

References

Further reading

External links 
 
 

Solute carrier family